Gamma Knife (or Gamma Knife/Grey Dream) is the fifth studio album by American avant-garde metal band Kayo Dot. The album was self-released through frontman Toby Driver's Ice Level Music via Bandcamp on January 4, 2012, following the group's departure from Hydra Head Records. The bulk of the album was recorded live at Brooklyn, New York venue Littlefield on October 5, 2011, with the remainder recorded at Driver's residence in late 2011. It was mixed by longtime producer Randall Dunn. It is notable for beginning the return to Driver's metal roots and harsh vocals used in Choirs of the Eye. The vinyl and CD copies are both available via the group's Bandcamp.

Track listing
All songs written by Toby Driver. Lyrics written by Jason Byron and Toby Driver.

Credits
Toby Driver - vocals, bass, guitar, keyboards
Terran Olson - alto sax
Daniel Means - alto sax
Keith Abrams - drums
Mia Matsumiya - violin
Tim Byrnes - mellotron
Ron Varod - audience direction
David Bodie - percussion

References

2011 albums
Kayo Dot albums